Hogging can mean:

 Hogging (sexual practice)
 Hogging and sagging, the stress a ship is put under when it passes over the crest of a wave
 Hogging (UK English), the cutting of a horse's mane so that it is very short, also called "roaching"

See also 
 Hog (disambiguation)